Handle With Care European Tour '89 is a live video released by Nuclear Assault in 1990. The video is a recording of a concert at the Hammersmith Odeon in London, England on October 4, 1989.

Track listing
 "F# (Wake Up)"
 "When Freedom Dies"
 "Rise from the Ashes"
 "Brainwashed"
 "F#"
 "New Song"
 "Critical Mass"
 "Game Over"
 "Nightmares"
 "Buttfuck"
 "Fight to be Free"
 "Survive"
 "Torture Tactics"
 "Trail of Tears"
 "Mothers Day"
 "My America"
 "Hang the Pope"
 "Lesbians"
 "Emergency"
 "Funky Noise"
 "Good Times Bad Times"
 "Technology"
 "Equal Rights"

Nuclear Assault video albums